Phyllis Chemutai (born 30 June 1962), is a Ugandan politician who represented Kapchorwa district in the 9th Parliament of Uganda, and is now the Woman MP elect for Kapchorwa district, representing her district for the second time in the 11th Parliament of Uganda after the general election in January 2021.

She is a member of the governing National Resistance Movement.

References 

21st-century Ugandan politicians
Members of the Parliament of Uganda
1962 births
Living people